The Third Nero: or Never Say Nero Again is a historical novel by British writer Lindsey Davis, the fifth in her Flavia Albia series. It was first published in the UK on 6 April 2017 by Hodder & Stoughton and in the United States in 2017 by St. Martin's Press.

The tale is set in Ancient Rome and opens in September AD 89, immediately after the previous novel The Graveyard of the Hesperides closes (Flavia's husband having been struck by lightning during their wedding celebration).

The story revolves around the third Pseudo-Nero, who had the support of the Parthians. Falco and Helena, Albia's adoptive parents, are mentioned but do not appear. The plot also involves a vicious white cat, a war elephant, a military archive, cataphracts and several references to public toilets including "the event which would supersede everything else when the Daily Gazette wrote up today's events".

The UK paperback cover image is of a two-faced Janus head from Vulci.

References

Novels set in ancient Rome
British historical novels
Flavia Albia novels
2017 British novels
Hodder & Stoughton books
Novels set in the 1st century